The 1999 Youngstown State Penguins football team was an American football team represented Youngstown State University in the Gateway Conference during the 1999 NCAA Division I-AA football season. In their 14th season under head coach Jim Tressel, the team compiled a 12–3 record (5–1 against conference opponents) and lost to Georgia Southern in the 1999 NCAA Division I-AA Football Championship Game. It was Youngstown State's sixth appearance in the national championship game during the 1990s.

Tailback Adrian Brown received the team's most valuable player award. The team's statistical leaders included Brown with 1,589 rushing yards and 108 points scored, Jeff Ryan with 2,573 passing yards, Elliott Giles with 1,301 receiving yards, and Ian Dominelli with 224 tackles (including 92 solo tackles).

Schedule

References

Youngstown State
Youngstown State Penguins football seasons
Youngstown State Penguins football